The chapters of the Claymore manga series are written and drawn by Norihiro Yagi. They began serialization by Shueisha, first in Monthly Shōnen Jump and were later on serialized in Jump Square. The series follows the adventures of Clare, a Claymore, or human-yoma hybrid, and her comrades as they fight for survival in a world filled with yoma, or shapeshifting demons.

The first chapter was released in 2001 in Monthly Shōnen Jump, but afterwards the chapters were released in the Weekly Shōnen Jump on a monthly basis due to the discontinuation of the prior magazine. The manga was later serialized in the Jump Square magazine, Shueisha's replacement for the Monthly Shōnen Jump. 155 chapters in all were released in Japan. An anime adaptation of the manga was announced in the October 2006 edition of Monthly Shōnen Jump. The first episode of the anime aired on April 3, 2007 on Nippon Television, with the last one shown on September 25, 2007.

The chapters have been compiled into 27 tankōbon in Japan by Shueisha. The first volume was released on January 5, 2002, with the 27th released on December 4, 2014. All of the volumes contain six chapters of the original manga, with the exception of the first, which contained only four chapters, and the second, incorporating the next five chapters. Viz Media announced the serialization of the Claymore manga in North America on July 18, 2006 at the San Diego Comic-Con International. Twenty-seven volumes of the English adaptation of the manga were released by Viz Media.

Volume list

Chapter not in tankōbon format
This single extra chapter has not been published in a tankōbon volume.

Extra Scene 5.

See also

List of Claymore episodes
List of Claymore characters

References

External links
Official Shueisha site for the Claymore manga 

Claymore (manga)
Claymore